Sudivya Kumar is an Indian politician and an MLA elected from Giridih block of Jharkhand state as a member of Jharkhand Mukti Morcha 2019.

References

Living people
Year of birth missing (living people)
21st-century Indian politicians
Lok Sabha members from Jharkhand
People from Jharkhand
People from Giridih district
Date of birth missing (living people)
Place of birth missing (living people)
Jharkhand Mukti Morcha politicians